Maximo Blanco (born October 16, 1983) is a Venezuelan professional mixed martial artist who last competed in the Featherweight division of the Ultimate Fighting Championship. A professional competitor since 2008, Blanco is the former Lightweight King of Pancrase and has also competed in Strikeforce and World Victory Road.

Background
Blanco, originally from Venezuela, trained in Tae Kwon Do for three years, reaching the rank of green belt, before being introduced to wrestling at the age of 14 by his cousin. Blanco competed in the sport for a year at German Villalobos High School, before being recruited to compete for the inaugural team at Sendai Ikuei Gakuen High School in Japan along with three other Venezuelans. Blanco faced problems with bullying and fitting into a new society, but continued to excel at wrestling, winning All-Japan honors before being recruited again to compete at Nihon University. Upon graduating, Blanco continued competing and won International Championships in Venezuela, China, and Azerbaijan. Blanco was also a competitor at the 2007 Pan American Games and came close to winning a Bronze Medal in the 144 lb weight division, he later lost the third place match via points to Peruvian grappler Aldo Parimango.

Mixed martial arts career

Pancrase
Blanco made his mixed martial arts debut on August 27, 2008 against Yuki Yashima at Pancrase: Shining 6. The bout ended in a no contest after an accidental headbutt.

He returned to the promotion at Pancrase: Shining 8 on October 1, 2008 and knocked out Hiroki Aoki with a slam and punches in just 22 seconds.

Blanco faced Daisuke Hanazawa at Pancrase: Shining 10 on December 7, 2008 and was defeated by submission due to an arm-triangle choke in the second round.

He faced Koji Oishi at Pancrase: Changing Tour 2 on April 5, 2009. The fight was ruled a draw after two rounds.

Sengoku Raiden Championship
Blanco made his debut for Sengoku Raiden Championship at World Victory Road Presents: Sengoku no Ran 2009 on January 4, 2009 and knocked out standout wrestler Seigo Inoue with stomps in 38 seconds, it was later revealed in a SRC press conference that Blanco had broken Seigo's orbital bone with the stomps and Inoue was later forced into a 3-year retirement to rehabilitate his injury.

Blanco returned to SRC at Sengoku 8 on May 2, 2009 against Akihiko Mori. He was disqualified after striking Mori with an illegal soccer kick after knocking him down with a punch.

In his next fight, Blanco became the Lightweight King of Pancrase by defeating veteran Katsuya Inoue, older brother of Seigo Inoue, with punches in the second round at Pancrase: Changing Tour 4 on August 8, 2009.

Blanco faced Tetsuya Yamada at Sengoku 10 on September 23, 2009. He won the fight by TKO in the second round.

On March 7, 2010, Blanco knocked out Chang Hyun Kim with a head kick at Sengoku Raiden Championships 12.

Blanco was matched up against Rodrigo Damm at Sengoku Raiden Championships 13 on June 20, 2010. He defeated Damm by TKO early in the second round.

Blanco faced Kiuma Kunioku at Sengoku Raiden Championship 15 on October 30, 2010. He won the fight via KO late in the first round.

On April 11, 2011, Pancrase announced Blanco had vacated his title, due to an inability to defend his belt because of numerous injuries.

Strikeforce
Blanco next signed a three-fight deal with Strikeforce.

Blanco was expected to face Josh Thomson at Strikeforce 36 but a foot injury caused Thompson to drop out. Pat Healy stepped in for the injured Thomson. Blanco lost the bout via submission in the second round.

Ultimate Fighting Championship
On September 14, 2011, Blanco's management stated that he would be moving down to the Featherweight division and that his next fight would be in the UFC.

In his debut, Blanco faced Marcus Brimage on April 21, 2012 at UFC 145. He lost the fight via split decision.

For his second fight with the promotion, Blanco took on Sam Sicilia on April 13, 2013 at The Ultimate Fighter 17 Finale. He won the back-and-forth fight via unanimous decision.

Blanco faced Akira Corassani on November 30, 2013 at The Ultimate Fighter 18 Finale. Early in the opening round Blanco landed an illegal knee to the head of Corassani when he had a knee and hand on the ground. Corassani indicated that he was unable to continue, so Blanco lost the bout via disqualification.

Blanco faced Felipe Arantes on February 15, 2014 at UFC Fight Night 36. He lost the fight via unanimous decision.

Blanco then faced Andy Ogle on May 31, 2014 at UFC Fight Night 41. He won the fight by unanimous decision.

Blanco next faced Dan Hooker on September 20, 2014 at UFC Fight Night 52. He won the fight via unanimous decision.

Blanco next faced Mike De La Torre on July 12, 2015 at The Ultimate Fighter 21 Finale. He won the fight via TKO in the first round.

Blanco was expected to face Dennis Bermudez on January 17, 2016 at UFC Fight Night 81. However, Bermudez pulled out of the fight in early December citing injury and was replaced by promotional newcomer Luke Sanders. He lost the fight via submission in the first round.

Blanco returned to face Chas Skelly on September 17, 2016 at UFC Fight Night 94. He lost the fight via submission in the fight's opening minute.

Championships and accomplishments

Mixed martial arts
Pancrase
Pancrase Lightweight Championship (One time)
Sherdog
2010 All-Violence Second Team

Mixed martial arts record

|-
|Loss
|align=center|12–8–1 (1)
|Chas Skelly
|Technical Submission (anaconda choke)
|UFC Fight Night: Poirier vs. Johnson
|
|align=center|1
|align=center|0:19
|Hidalgo, Texas, United States
|
|-
|Loss
|align=center|12–7–1 (1)
|Luke Sanders
|Submission (rear-naked choke)
|UFC Fight Night: Dillashaw vs. Cruz
|
|align=center|1
|align=center|3:38
|Boston, Massachusetts, United States
|      
|-
| Win
| align=center| 12–6–1 (1)
| Mike De La Torre
| TKO (punches)
| The Ultimate Fighter: American Top Team vs. Blackzilians Finale 
| 
| align=center| 1
| align=center| 0:16
| Las Vegas, Nevada, United States
| 
|-
| Win
| align=center| 11–6–1 (1)
| Dan Hooker
| Decision (unanimous)
| UFC Fight Night: Hunt vs. Nelson
| 
| align=center| 3
| align=center| 5:00
| Saitama, Japan
| 
|-
| Win
| align=center| 10–6–1 (1)
| Andy Ogle
| Decision (unanimous)
| UFC Fight Night: Munoz vs. Mousasi
| 
| align=center| 3
| align=center| 5:00
| Berlin, Germany
| 
|-
|  Loss
| align=center| 9–6–1 (1)
| Felipe Arantes
| Decision (unanimous)
| UFC Fight Night: Machida vs. Mousasi
| 
| align=center| 3
| align=center| 5:00
| Jaraguá do Sul, Brazil
| 
|-
|  Loss
| align=center| 9–5–1 (1)
| Akira Corassani
| DQ (illegal knee)
| The Ultimate Fighter: Team Rousey vs. Team Tate Finale
| 
| align=center| 1
| align=center| 0:25
| Las Vegas, Nevada, United States
| 
|-
|  Win
| align=center| 9–4–1 (1)
| Sam Sicilia
| Decision (unanimous)
| The Ultimate Fighter: Team Jones vs. Team Sonnen Finale
| 
| align=center| 3
| align=center| 5:00
| Las Vegas, Nevada, United States
| 
|-
| Loss
| align=center| 8–4–1 (1)
| Marcus Brimage
| Decision (split)
| UFC 145
| 
| align=center| 3
| align=center| 5:00
| Atlanta, Georgia, United States
| 
|-
| Loss
| align=center| 8–3–1 (1)
| Pat Healy
| Submission (rear-naked choke)
| Strikeforce: Barnett vs. Kharitonov
| 
| align=center| 2
| align=center| 4:27
| Cincinnati, Ohio, United States
| 
|-
|  Win
| align=center| 8–2–1 (1)
| Won Sik Park
| Decision (unanimous)
| World Victory Road Presents: Soul of Fight
| 
| align=center| 3
| align=center| 5:00
| Tokyo, Japan
| 
|-
|  Win
| align=center| 7–2–1 (1)
| Kiuma Kunioku
| KO (punches)
| World Victory Road Presents: Sengoku Raiden Championships 15
| 
| align=center| 1
| align=center| 4:26
| Tokyo, Japan
| 
|-
| Win
| align=center| 6–2–1 (1)
| Rodrigo Damm
| TKO (punches)
| World Victory Road Presents: Sengoku Raiden Championships 13
| 
| align=center| 2
| align=center| 0:45
| Saitama, Japan
| 
|-
| Win
| align=center| 5–2–1 (1)
| Chang Hyun Kim
| KO (head kick and punches)
| World Victory Road Presents: Sengoku Raiden Championships 12
| 
| align=center| 1
| align=center| 1:10
| Tokyo, Japan
| 
|-
| Win
| align=center| 4–2–1 (1)
| Tetsuya Yamada
| TKO (punches)
| World Victory Road Presents: Sengoku 10
| 
| align=center| 2
| align=center| 1:12
| Saitama, Japan
| 
|-
| Win
| align=center| 3–2–1 (1)
| Katsuya Inoue
| TKO (punches)
| Pancrase: Changing Tour 4
| 
| align=center| 2
| align=center| 4:38
| Tokyo, Japan
| Won the Lightweight King of Pancrase Championship.
|-
| Loss
| align=center| 2–2–1 (1)
| Akihiko Mori
| DQ (illegal soccer kick)
| World Victory Road Presents: Sengoku 8
| 
| align=center| 1
| align=center| 4:20
| Tokyo, Japan
| 
|-
| Draw
| align=center| 2–1–1 (1)
| Koji Oishi
| Draw
| Pancrase: Changing Tour 2
| 
| align=center| 2
| align=center| 5:00
| Tokyo, Japan
| 
|-
| Win
| align=center| 2–1 (1)
| Seigo Inoue
| KO (stomps)
| World Victory Road Presents: Sengoku no Ran 2009
| 
| align=center| 1
| align=center| 0:38
| Saitama, Japan
| 
|-
| Loss
| align=center| 1–1 (1)
| Daisuke Hanazawa
| Submission (arm-triangle choke)
| Pancrase: Shining 10
| 
| align=center| 2
| align=center| 2:19
| Tokyo, Japan
| 
|-
| Win
| align=center| 1–0 (1)
| Hiroki Aoki
| TKO (slam and punches)
| Pancrase: Shining 8
| 
| align=center| 1
| align=center| 0:22
| Tokyo, Japan
| 
|-
| NC
| align=center| 0–0 (1)
| Yuki Yashima
| NC (accidental headbutt)
| Pancrase: Shining 6
| 
| align=center| 1
| align=center| 0:56
| Tokyo, Japan
|

See also
 List of current UFC fighters
 List of male mixed martial artists

References

External links

 

Living people
1983 births
People from Falcón
Venezuelan male mixed martial artists
Lightweight mixed martial artists
Mixed martial artists utilizing taekwondo
Mixed martial artists utilizing wrestling
Mixed martial artists utilizing Muay Thai
Venezuelan Muay Thai practitioners
Venezuelan male sport wrestlers
Wrestlers at the 2007 Pan American Games
Pan American Games competitors for Venezuela
Venezuelan expatriate sportspeople in Japan
Venezuelan male taekwondo practitioners
Nihon University alumni
Ultimate Fighting Championship male fighters